Nee Unnai Arindhaal is a 2009 Tamil language drama film directed by V. Rishiraj and Indian Bhaskar. The film stars Murali, V. Rishiraj, and newcomer Kushi, while Risha, T. K. Kala, Dhadha Muthukumar, Indian Bhaskar, and T. Harikrishnan playing supporting roles. The film, produced by Z. T. Choudhary, had musical score by R. K. Sundar and was released on 3 July 2009.

Plot
Sadai (V. Rishiraj) is an orphan who was adopted by Gopal's (Murali) mother (T. K. Kala) when he was a child, and she considers Sadai as her own son. Gopal and Sadai are rickshaw pullers and best friends. They live in a slum with their mother, who runs a roadside dosa business where the poor people can eat there for cheap. Gopal and Sadai are kind-hearted people. Gopal is a soft person without any bad habits, whereas Sadai is a big brute who loves drinking alcohol and sleeping with prostitutes. Gopal has a cousin named Valli (Kushi), and they are in love with each other. They eventually get married, and Valli moves in Gopal's small house; thus, Gopal's mother and Sadai have to sleep in front of the house.

Gopal and his mother do not want to see Sadai being alone, so they decide to find him a wife. One day, they force Sadai to see a woman, who they choose for him to be married to, but the woman insults Sadai for being an ugly man and alcoholic. Gopal and his wife Valli reassure Sadai and swear to find him a better woman. Shortly after, Gopal's mother dies of a heart attack. Things get sticky when Valli gets pregnant as she finds that Sadai is having a bad influence on her husband. Valli complains to Gopal about Sadai's bad habits and tells him to stop hanging out with him, but Gopal refuses to follow his wife's instruction and tells her that his friend is more important than anything else.

Sadai wants to sleep with the beautiful prostitute Dashani (Risha), but he does not have enough money to pay her. Later, Gopal gives him his wife's ornaments to repair his rickshaw. Sadai then trades the jewels for money, but instead of repairing his vehicle, he pays Dashani to sleep with him. The big Sadai starts to hurt the little Dashani; thus, she refused to sleep with him, and she threw his money in his face. The heavily intoxicated Sadai then goes to Gopal's house, and Valli reluctantly welcomes him. Sadai assaults and brutally rapes Valli. She dies after the assault, and Sadai left the house. Gopal returns home after a hard day's work and discovers his wife's dead body. Gopal thought that she had committed suicide because he refused to follow her advice.

After the funeral, a neighbour reveals to Gopal that his best friend Sadai killed his wife, but Gopal refuses to believe him first. One night, the neighbour curses Sadai for killing Valli. Sadai then kills him for being the only witness of the murder. The next day, his dead body was found under a bridge. Gopal has had this suspicion that Sadai might have murdered his wife, so he decides to unearth his wife's corpse, and he finds Sadai's hair there. He is therefore heartbroken and mad with rage all at the same time. Later that night, Gopal finds an intoxicated Sadai in a chemical warehouse. Gopal beats Sadai up, disposes his body in a gallon barrel, and dissolves his body with nitric acid.

Cast

Murali as Gopal
V. Rishiraj as Sadai
Kushi as Valli
Risha as Dashani
T. K. Kala as Gopal's mother
Dhadha Muthukumar as Muthu, Valli's father
Indian Bhaskar
T. Harikrishnan
Laila
Chithra
Rail Ravi
Sirkazhi M. Siva
Central Karuna
MGR Nagar Elango
Minor
Thangaraj
Raja
Murugan
Parthiban
Master Sabari Priyan as Young Gopal
Master Nirmal as Young Sadai

Production
Murali signed to play the role of a rickshaw puller. Newcomer Kushi was chosen to play the female lead role, with V. Rishiraj, T. K. Kala, Dhadha Muthukumar, and T. Harikrishnan playing supporting roles. R. K. Sundar has scored the music for the lyrics jotted down by Indian Bhaskar. V. Rishiraj and Indian Bhaskar had written the story, screenplay and dialogues, and the latter is taking care of the stunts. Z. T. Choudhary produced the film under the banner 24 Frames Productions.

Soundtrack

The film score and the soundtrack were composed by R. K. Sundar. The soundtrack, released in 2009, features 6 tracks with lyrics written by Indian Bhaskar. Actor Narain, director Rama Narayanan, producer Chandra Prakash Jain, Murali, V. Rishiraj and Kushi attended the audio launch.

Release
The film had a low-key theatrical release across Tamil Nadu in July 2009. A reviewer from Dinamalar said, "Murali's underplayed performance in the title role is far better than V. Rishiraj over-the-top's acting" and added that the rest of the cast were apt but criticized the film's screenplay and presentation.

References

2009 films
2000s Tamil-language films
Indian action drama films
Films about rape in India
2009 action drama films